The 2011 SEC Championship Game was played on December 3, 2011, in the Georgia Dome in Atlanta, Georgia, and determined the 2011 football champion of the Southeastern Conference (SEC). The game featured the Georgia Bulldogs of the Eastern division against the LSU Tigers of the Western division. LSU (the Western division champion) was the designated "home team". This was Georgia's 4th SEC Championship Game and LSU's 5th, and the 3rd time these two teams met in this game. LSU defeated Georgia in 2003 and Georgia defeated LSU in 2005.

LSU defeated Georgia in the 2011 SEC championship game 42–10.  The game's MVP was LSU cornerback Tyrann Mathieu.  The game was televised by CBS Sports, for the eleventh straight season.

LSU moved to 4–1 in SEC Championship Games and Georgia to 2–2.

References

Championship
SEC Championship Game
LSU Tigers football games
Georgia Bulldogs football games
December 2011 sports events in the United States
2011 in sports in Georgia (U.S. state)
2011 in Atlanta